The Saint Vincent and the Grenadines competed at the 2019 Pan American Games in Lima, Peru from July 26 to August 11, 2019.

The full team of four athletes (three men and one woman) competing in three sports (athletics, cycling and swimming) was named on July 2, 2019. During the opening ceremony of the games, cyclist Zefal Bailey carried the flag of the country as part of the parade of nations.

Competitors
The following is the list of number of competitors (per gender) participating at the games per sport/discipline.

Athletics (track and field)

The Saint Vincent and the Grenadines qualified one male athlete.

Key
Note–Ranks given for track events are for the entire round

Men
Track events

Cycling

The Saint Vincent and the Grenadines received a reallocated quota for a male road cyclist.

Road
Men

Swimming

The Saint Vincent and the Grenadines received two universality spots in swimming to enter one man and one woman.

References

Nations at the 2019 Pan American Games
2019
2019 in Saint Vincent and the Grenadines sport